Lakselvbukt Church is a parish church of the Church of Norway in Tromsø Municipality in Troms og Finnmark county, Norway. It is located in the village of Lakselvbukt on the southeastern shore of the inner Ullsfjorden. It is one of the churches for the Ullsfjord parish which is part of the Tromsø domprosti (arch-deanery) in the Diocese of Nord-Hålogaland. The blue and red, wooden church was built in a long church style in 1983 using plans drawn up by the architect Harry Gangvik. The church seats about 250 people.

See also
List of churches in Nord-Hålogaland

References

Churches in Tromsø
Churches in Troms
Wooden churches in Norway
20th-century Church of Norway church buildings
Churches completed in 1983
1983 establishments in Norway
Long churches in Norway